Küçükkuyu is a town (belde) in the Ayvacık District, Çanakkale Province, Turkey. Its population is 10,604 (2021).

Geography 

Küçükkuyu is a coastal town on the north shore of the Edremit Gulf of the Aegean Sea. The Greek island Lesbos is at the south west. The Ida mountains of the mythology is on the north.

History

Küçükkuyu and the surroundings is full of ruins of antiquity. According to legend, Zeus watched the battle of Troy from an altar near Küçükkuyu and Aphrodite discovered a source of healing water in Küçükkuyu. The present settlement was founded by Yörüks (nomadic Turkmens) and later Turkish refugees from Balkan countries also settled in Küçükkuyu. Küçükkuyu was declared a seat of township in 1989.

Economy

The original economic activity of Küçükkuyu was olive agriculture and fishing. But it is a touristic town nowadays and the service sector constitutes another portion of town revenues.

References

Populated places in Çanakkale Province
Towns in Turkey
Ayvacık District, Çanakkale